is a Japanese former volleyball player who competed in the 1984 Summer Olympics and in the 1988 Summer Olympics. Since retiring he has been working as a sports announcer and television tarento.

In 2022, Shunichi Kawai was elected to ba the president of Japan Volleyball Association.

References

External links
Official profile K-Bros (in Japanese)

1963 births
Living people
Japanese men's volleyball players
Olympic volleyball players of Japan
Volleyball players at the 1984 Summer Olympics
Volleyball players at the 1988 Summer Olympics
Japanese sports announcers
Japanese television personalities